Alfie Mafi (born 8 June 1988) is an Australian professional rugby union football player of Tongan descent. His usual position is wing. Mafi has represented Australia in rugby sevens and at under-19 level at the IRB World Championships. He currently plays in the French Top 14 league for Brive.

Early life
Mafi was born in Tongatapu, Tonga and moved to Australia with his family in 1997. He attended Granville Boys High School in Sydney and played for the Australian Schoolboys rugby team in 2006. He is the younger brother of Winston Mafi.

Rugby career
Mafi was a member of the New South Wales Waratahs squad in 2007, and played for the Sydney Fleet in the Australian Rugby Championship. He played for Australia at the 2007 Under 19 Rugby World Championship in Belfast in 2007 and scored the try that sealed the win over Wales in the play-off for third place.

He was also selected for the Australian Sevens squad during the 2007–08 IRB Sevens World Series, playing in the Dubai and South Africa tournaments.

Mafi made his Super 14 debut for the Waratahs in 2008 and was selected for the Australia under 20 team later that year but was forced to withdraw due to an ankle injury.

He moved to the Brumbies where he has played in 2009 and 2010. Mafi joined the  where he played between 2011 and 2013. Despite strong performances in 2013, he was axed mid-season for "a number of infringements of team standards and disciplinary indiscretions".

It was reported that he would join Japanese Top League side Honda Heat but he finally signed with Brive on a one-year deal with a one-year option.

References

External links
 

itsrugby.co.uk profile

Living people
ACT Brumbies players
Western Force players
New South Wales Waratahs players
CA Brive players
Rugby union fullbacks
Rugby union wings
1988 births
Australian rugby union players
Australia international rugby sevens players
Tongan emigrants to Australia
Expatriate rugby union players in France